Famille Perrin are the owners of Château de Beaucastel, a Rhône winery in Orange, Vaucluse, France. As of 2006, the family is a member of the Primum Familiae Vini.

Wine criticism
Its red wine blend Famille Perrin Chateauneuf-du-Pape Les Chapouins Vieilles Vignes 2006 was rated 92 points by Wine Spectator.

Robert M. Parker, Jr has stated: "The Perrins believe in natural winemaking, unfiltered wines, and routinely produce long-lived classics that are among the finest in the world."

References

External links

One Year in The Southern Rhône Valley with the Perrin Family on YouTube

French wine
Primum Familiae Vini